Hyesan Airfield(혜산비행장) is an airport near Hyesan, Ryanggang-do, North Korea.

Facilities 
The airfield has a single gravel runway 06/24 measuring 4540 x 105 feet (1384 x 32 m). However, another source reports it as 5282 x 206 feet (1610 x 63 m).

It is sited near the northern border with China. The facility was extensively improved in 1971, and there may have been further plans to pave the airfield, based on the continued presence of construction vehicles.

References 

Airports in North Korea